ScotsGay was a bi-monthly magazine published in Scotland for the lesbian, gay and bisexual community. Its website carried textfiles of all issues and, from 2005, pdf files of the whole magazine. John Hein was editor from issue 1 (December 1994) until issue 69 (April 2006), after which the editorship passed to Martin Walker; Hein remained the publisher until regular publication ceased after issue 179 (October 2016), by which time he had reassumed editorship.

At this point the magazine was put in hiatus after John Hein suffered a minor stroke; although the website was subsequently updated with promises of ScotsGay returning during Summer 2017., it did not do so.

In the summer of 2019, it was announced that Taylor Crockett has taken over as editor with a brand new relaunch scheduled for April 2020. Again, the magazine did not appear. John Hein died in December 2020.

The magazine was based in Edinburgh, but featured "scene" contributors from across Scotland.

See also
 List of magazines published in Scotland

References

External links
ScotsGay  - official website

LGBT-related magazines published in Scotland
Magazines established in 1994
Bi-monthly magazines published in the United Kingdom
Mass media in Edinburgh
LGBT culture in Edinburgh